John Kenneally is an Australian radio presenter based in Adelaide, who after many years on ABC radio, moved to commercial radio in 2010.

Career

FIVEaa
Kenneally is currently part of talk station FIVEaa's breakfast team with Keith Conlon, Jane Doyle, Chris McDermott and Tim Ginever. He joined the station in late 2010 replacing the retiring Tony Pilkington. He left the breakfast shift in 2013 to present a Saturday night program on the station.

ABC 891
Prior to joining FIVEaa, Kenneally co-presented ABC 891's Bald Brothers Breakfast Show with Tony McCarthy. He held  a decade long partnership with McCarthy, originally as an evening presenter, with the duo presenting their final  ABC 891 breakfast program on 16 November 2010, shortly before Kenneally began work at FIVEaa. He joined the station in January 1984, and in his earlier career he worked as a Music Director  at 891 and produced for several on-air presenters, including his FIVEaa colleague Keith Conlon.

References

 http://www.abc.net.au/local/stories/2010/11/19/3070791.htm
 https://www.adelaidenow.com.au/archive/entertainment/confidential/news/abcs-bald-brother-john-kenneally-set-to-replace-tony-pilkington-at-fiveaa/news-story/b7370d37fcbf9ce181f9ca5b0539a0b2?sv=2e3560050ef079ca725bcf08881a2669
https://www.radioinfo.com.au/people/movements/john-kenneally-will
https://www.afc.com.au/news/2012-03-20/new-ambassadors-in-2012
 https://radiotoday.com.au/move/john-kenneally-2/
 https://www.radioinfo.com.au/people/movements?page15=&page=117

Australian radio presenters
Living people
Year of birth missing (living people)